Scaevola glabra, the 'ohe naupaka,  is a shrub in the family Goodeniaceae.  The flowers are yellow.

The plant is endemic to Hawaii, and naturally found on Oahu and Kaua'i.

References

glabra
Endemic flora of Hawaii
Biota of Kauai
Biota of Oahu
Taxa named by William Jackson Hooker
Flora without expected TNC conservation status